Meem is the letter Mem (also known as Meem / Mim), the thirteenth letter of many Semitic language abjads, including Phoenician, Aramaic, Hebrew and Arabic 

Meem may also refer to:

Gilbert S. Meem (1824–1908), Virginia politician and Confederate brigadier general
John Gaw Meem (1894–1983), American architect 
Meem (bank), the retail banking arm of Gulf International Bank
The commonly used phonetic pronunciation of the abbreviation for the Mechanical Engineering-Engineering Mechanics building at Michigan Technological University
Bidya Sinha Saha Mim (born 1992), Bangladeshi actress

See also
Meme (disambiguation)